Ko Kyung-soo (born 5 February 1985) is a Korean handball player who competed in the 2008 Summer Olympics and 2012 Summer Olympics.

References

1985 births
Living people
South Korean male handball players
Olympic handball players of South Korea
Handball players at the 2008 Summer Olympics
Handball players at the 2012 Summer Olympics
Handball players at the 2006 Asian Games
Asian Games competitors for South Korea
21st-century South Korean people